Diogenornis is an extinct genus of ratites, that lived during the Early Eocene (Itaboraian to Casamayoran in the SALMA classification). It was described in 1983 by Brazilian scientist Herculano Marcos Ferraz de Alvarenga based on fossils found in the Itaboraí Formation in southeastern Brazil. The type species is D. fragilis. While initially considered a member of the family Opisthodactylidae, further examination of the fossil remains showed that it was more similar to the modern rhea. According to Gerald Mayr, Diogenornis is best considered a stem-group member of the Rheidae.

Description 
However, recent phylogenetic studies have shown a closer affiliation to Australian ratites, the cassowaries and emus. This may reevaluate the origins and distribution of this clade, expanding their range to the South American Paleocene, well before the appearance of Emuarius. Recent findings nonetheless show that it co-existed with early rheas, meaning the ratite diversity of South America was very high during the Paleogene.

Diogenornis possesses a rather narrow beak, similar to that of tinamous, lithornithids and cassowaries, as well as rather large wings.  These traits, both rather unspecialised, seem to suggest a then recent development from a flying ancestor.

References 

Casuariiformes
Ratites
Prehistoric bird genera
Eocene birds of South America
Ypresian life
Casamayoran
Riochican
Itaboraian
Paleogene Brazil
Fossils of Brazil
Fossil taxa described in 1983